Fred Martinson  (February 22, 1947 – February 5, 2012) was an American motorcycle trials rider. Martinson was four times AHRMA Vintage National Trials Champion, winning titles in 2003, 2008, 2009 and 2010, competing in approximately 615 trials through his career. In 2011 he was inducted into the NATC Hall of Fame. The Martinson family are still deeply involved in the sport with Fred's sons Derek and Brian competing at National level for many years, and now grandchildren are starting to also compete
.

Biography
Fred was born in Virginia, Minnesota in 1947 and moved to Casper, Wyoming in 1981
. It was while in Wyoming that Fred became involved with motorcycle trials riding, competing in his first event in 1983
.
As a long time member of the Wyoming Motorcycle Trials Association Fred was involved in setting eleven NATC events
.

In 2001 Fred turned his skills to riding in the AHRMA Vintage Nationals around the country, winning his first title in the Modern Classic Intermediate class in 2003
.

The 2008 season was a tough one for Fred. He was diagnosed with lung cancer and given 18 months to live. In typical Fred fashion he didn't let this spoil his season and went on to take another AHRMA National title
.

During his final season in 2011, Fred continued to ride with the aid of an oxygen tank on his back and was actually accused of cheating while at a California event as it was considered an advantage for high altitude riding. He rounded out his career with a fine 2nd place in the AHRMA Nationals
, quite remarkable considering Fred's health at the time.

AHRMA National Trials Championship Career

Honors 
 AHRMA Modern Classic Intermediate Champion 2003, 2008, 2010
 AHRMA Premier Lightweight Intermediate Champion 2009
Elected to the NATC Hall of Fame in 2011

Related Reading 
 NATC Trials Championship
 AHRMA Vintage Nationals

References 

1947 births
American motorcycle racers
Motorcycle trials riders
People from Virginia
2012 deaths